Michal Kubala (born 12 June 1980) is a Slovakia footballer who plays as a midfielder for TJ Družstevník Veľké Ludince in the Slovak 3. Liga.

In 2012, he played for Perak FA in the 2012 Malaysia Super League season and was the team's top scorer of the season, securing 13 goals in the league. He was known in the league as a dead-ball specialist, and was Perak's main free-kick, corner kick and penalty kick taker. His contract was not renewed by Perak at the end of the 2012 season.

Kubala was a member of the Slovakia youth teams, appearing for the Slovakia U18 and Slovakia U21 teams. During his time in Malaysia, he also appeared in the Malaysia Selection, a team composed of Malaysia under-21 players and a selection of Malaysia league players, for the 2012 Java Cup invitational tournament in Indonesia. He scored a goal as Malaysia Selection beat Indonesia Selection 6-0.

References

1980 births
Living people
People from Levice
Sportspeople from the Nitra Region
Slovak footballers
Slovakia youth international footballers
Slovakia under-21 international footballers
Slovak expatriate footballers
Association football midfielders
Slovak Super Liga players
Allsvenskan players
Liga I players
ŠK Slovan Bratislava players
CS Gaz Metan Mediaș players
FC Astra Giurgiu players
Perak F.C. players
MŠK Rimavská Sobota players
AS Trenčín players
FC Petržalka players
Ljungskile SK players
Selangor FA players
Expatriate footballers in Sweden
Expatriate footballers in Romania
Expatriate footballers in Malaysia
Slovak expatriate sportspeople in Romania